IguanaBee is an independent Chilean video game developer, established in 2011 and located in Santiago, Chile.

Overview 
The company has created games for different platforms and different clients, such as Mr Deadline for Wacom, Ciclania as well as educational purposes and MonsterBag with Sony Computer Entertainment and worked alongside Project Tango to create Raise.

The most recent titles that the company has developed are Headsnatchers and G.I. Joe: Operation Blackout.

Games

References 

Companies based in Santiago
Video game companies established in 2011
Video game companies of Chile
2011 establishments in Chile